Raven is a village in Momchilgrad Municipality, Kardzhali Province, Bulgaria.

References

Villages in Kardzhali Province